Staughton may refer to:

Places:
Staughton College, a secondary school in Melbourne, Australia
Great Staughton, a village in Huntingdonshire, England, United Kingdom
Little Staughton, a village in Bedfordshire, England, United Kingdom

People:
Samuel Thomas Staughton Sr. (1838–1901), English born-Australian politician
Staughton Lynd (1929-2022), American political activist
William Staughton (1770–1829), Baptist minister